Diarmuid Mac Bruideadha (Brody), Irish poet, died 1563.

Diarmuid was a member of the Mac Bruideadha brehon family, based at Ballybrody, parish of Dysert, barony of Inchiquin, County Clare. Other branches were located at Knockanalban in Ibrickane and Lettermoylan in Inchiquin.

The Annals of the Four Masters  describe Diarmuid, sub anno 1563, as follows:

 Mac Brody, Ollav of Hy-Bracain and Hy-Fearmaic, died, i.e. Dermot, son of Conor, son of Dermot, son of John; and his brother, Maoilin, took his place.

Family tree

   John Mac Bruideadha
   |
   |
   Diarmuid
   |
   |
   Concubhair
   |
   |___
   |                          |
   |                          |
   Diarmuid, d. 1563.   Maoilin, d. 1582.
                              | 
                              |
                              Maoilin Óg, d. 1602
                              |
                              |
                              Concubhair, fl. 1636.

See also

 Seán Buí Mac Bruideadha, fl. 14th century.
 Tadhg mac Dáire Mac Bruaideadha, c.1570-1652.

References

External links
 http://www.clarelibrary.ie/eolas/coclare/literature/bardic/clares_bardic_tradition.htm
 http://www.ucc.ie/celt/published/T100005E/

MacBrody family
Irish-language poets
People from County Clare
16th-century Irish historians
16th-century Irish writers
People of Elizabethan Ireland